David William Sims (born September 17, 1963) is an American musician, best known as the bass guitarist of the bands Scratch Acid (with whom he initially played guitar), Rapeman, and The Jesus Lizard. He has also recorded or performed with Sparklehorse, Rhys Chatham, Shivaree, Pigface, Flour, and others. Sims currently performs experimental solo electric bass as Unfact.

Sims was born and raised in Austin, Texas. His parents were an American-history professor and a nurse. Besides being a musician, Sims is a Certified Public Accountant and blogged on his personal website from 2008 to 2011, with only updates subsequently. In a Kreative Kontrol podcast in 2014, it was discussed that Sims "always had issues with the name" of Rapeman and that it was "the biggest musical regret" of his life. He lives in New York City.

Solo discography (as Unfact)
 2010 "Dead Wasp" 7" single (Ox-Ghost Recordings)
 2010 "Bleached Valentine" - split LP with Noveller (Ox-Ghost Recordings/Saffron Recordings)

References

External links
Web site of David Wm. Sims
Interview with the Montreal Mirror
Interview with I Heart Noise

Living people
American rock bass guitarists
Post-hardcore musicians
Noise rock musicians
1963 births
Musicians from Austin, Texas
Guitarists from Texas
American male bass guitarists
Scratch Acid members
Rapeman members
The Jesus Lizard members
20th-century American bass guitarists
20th-century American male musicians
Pigface members